Konsa is the surname of the following notable people:
Amalie Konsa (1873–1949), Estonian stage and actress and singer 
Ezri Konsa (born 1997), English football player
Oliver Konsa (born 1985), Estonian football player

See also
Konza (disambiguation)

Estonian-language surnames